Eino Aukusti Leino (7 April 1891 – 30 November 1986) was a Finnish freestyle wrestler. He competed at the 1920, 1924, 1928 and 1932 Olympics and won a medal each time, including a gold in 1920.

Leino started as a diver and association football goalkeeper before changing to wrestling. In late 1914 he immigrated to the United States, and therefore did not compete at Finnish, European and world championships until 1930s, when he returned to Finland. He won the American AAU Championships in 1920 and 1923 and placed second in Finnish championships in 1936. Leino was a carpenter by profession, and later in 1949–52 also worked as a sports functionary in Finland.

References

External links 
 

1891 births
1986 deaths
Olympic wrestlers of Finland
Wrestlers at the 1920 Summer Olympics
Wrestlers at the 1924 Summer Olympics
Wrestlers at the 1928 Summer Olympics
Wrestlers at the 1932 Summer Olympics
Finnish male sport wrestlers
Olympic gold medalists for Finland
Olympic silver medalists for Finland
Olympic bronze medalists for Finland
Olympic medalists in wrestling
People from Kuopio
Medalists at the 1920 Summer Olympics
Medalists at the 1924 Summer Olympics
Medalists at the 1928 Summer Olympics
Medalists at the 1932 Summer Olympics
Finnish expatriate sportspeople in the United States
Sportspeople from North Savo
19th-century Finnish people
20th-century Finnish people